The 2012–13 season was the 86th season in the history of U.S. Grosseto F.C. and the club's sixth consecutive season in the second division. The club participated in Serie B and the Coppa Italia.

Players

Out on loan

Competitions

Overall record

Serie B

League table

Results summary

Results by round

Matches

Coppa Italia

References 

F.C. Grosseto S.S.D.
Grosseto